Dave Richardson (born April 24, 1979) is a Scottish-born Canadian professional darts player.

Career

Richardson qualified for the 2015 PDC World Darts Championship after winning the North American Qualifier by beating Shaun Narain 3–1 in the final. He played against former runner-up Andy Hamilton in the first round and lost 3–2, having led 2–1 before Hamilton won the final two sets.

World Championship results

PDC
 2015: First round (lost to Andy Hamilton 2–3) (sets)

References

External links

1979 births
Living people
Canadian darts players
Professional Darts Corporation associate players
Scottish darts players
Scottish emigrants to Canada
Sportspeople from Owen Sound